Mândra is a commune in Brașov County, Transylvania, Romania. It is composed of five villages: Ileni (Illény), Mândra, Râușor (Reusor), Șona (Schönen; Sona), and Toderița (Todorica).

The commune is located in the west-central part of the county, close to the geographical center of Romania. It is traversed south to north by the Mândra and Sebeș rivers, which flow into the Olt a short distance away.

Natives
 Horia Sima, Iron Guard leader
 Mariana Tîrcă: handball player

References

Communes in Brașov County
Localities in Transylvania